This is a list of official languages by country and territory. It includes all languages that have official language status either statewide or in a part of the state, or that have status as a national language, regional language, or minority language.

Definitions 
 Official language: one designated as having a unique legal status in the state: typically, the language used in a nation's legislative bodies, and often, official government business.
 Regional language: one designated as having official status limited to a specific area, administrative division, or territory of the state. (On this page a regional language has parentheses next to it that contain a region, province, etc. where the language has regional status.)
 Minority language: (as used here) one spoken by a minority population within the state and officially designated as such; typically afforded protection and designated an officially permissible language for legal and government business in a specific area or territory of the state. (On this page a minority language is followed by parentheses that identify its minority status.)
 National language: one that uniquely represents the national identity of a state, nation, and/or country and is so designated by a country's government; some are technically minority languages. (On this page a national language is followed by parentheses that identify it as a national language status.) Some countries have more than one language with this status.

List of countries/territories

See also 
 List of official languages
 List of languages by the number of countries in which they are recognized as an official language

Notes

References 

 Language policy
 Official languages